Luciano Eufemio Agnolín (20 October 1915 – 20 October 1986) was an Argentine footballer, notable for being the all-time leading goalscorer at the second level of Argentine football. Twice, he was a top 3 scorer in Argentine Division A. Agnolín started his playing career in 1935 with Dock Sud in the Ascenso Tournament (2nd level). In 1936, he joined Tigre in the Argentine Primera but did not adapt and returned to the Ascenso with All Boys. In 1939, he joined Club Atlético Temperley where he scored 130 goals in 133 games. His good form gave him another chance to play in the Primera. This time he would play with Club Atlético Atlanta where he scored 21 goals to become the third highest scorer behind Angel Labruna and Atilio Melone. In 1944, he scored for the club 53 goals in 74 games before returning to the Ascenso in 1947 with Ferro Carril Oeste. He then spent time in Uruguay playing for Danubio F.C. He also played a friendly in the Argentina national team.

References

1915 births
1986 deaths
Sportspeople from Mendoza Province
Argentine footballers
Association football forwards
All Boys footballers
Club Atlético Tigre footballers
Club Atlético Atlanta footballers
Ferro Carril Oeste footballers
Danubio F.C. players
Expatriate footballers in Uruguay